Jean-Marie Richard (1879–1955) was a Canadian politician. He was the Liberal member of the Legislative Assembly of Quebec for Verchères from 1921 to 1927.

References
 

1879 births
1955 deaths
Quebec Liberal Party MNAs
People from Montérégie